Mahmoud Ramadan Elattar is a Paralympian athlete from Egypt competing mainly in category F57/58 throwing events.

Ramadan competed in both the F57/58 discus and javelin in the 2008 Summer Paralympics, taking home the silver medal in the javelin.

References

External links
 Results for Mahmoud Ramadan Elattar from the International Paralympic Committee

Paralympic athletes of Egypt
Athletes (track and field) at the 2008 Summer Paralympics
Paralympic silver medalists for Egypt
Living people
Year of birth missing (living people)
Medalists at the 2008 Summer Paralympics
Paralympic medalists in athletics (track and field)
Egyptian male discus throwers
Egyptian male javelin throwers